Rajesh Krishnakant Rao (born 9 December 1974) is a former English cricketer.  Rao was a right-handed batsman who bowled leg break googly.  He was born in Park Royal, London.

Rao made his first-class debut for Sussex against Cambridge University in 1996.  From 1996 to 1999, he represented the county in 27 first-class matches, the last of which came against Gloucestershire in the County Championship.  In his 27 first-class matches for Sussex, he scored 874 runs at an average of 20.80, with six half centuries and a high score of 89.  In the field he took 7 catches.  With the ball he took 4 wickets at a bowling average of 74.00, with best figures of 1/1.  It was for Sussex that Rao also made his debut in List A cricket, which came against Durham in the 1996 AXA Equity and Law League.  From 1996 to 1999, he represented the county in 40 List A matches, the last of which came against Gloucestershire in the Benson and Hedges Cup.

In 2000, he played his first List A match for the Middlesex Cricket Board against Wiltshire in the 2000 NatWest Trophy.  From 2000 to 2002, he represented the Board in four List A matches, the last of which came against Cambridgeshire in the 2nd round of the 2003 Cheltenham & Gloucester Trophy which was held in 2002.  In his career total of 44 List A matches, he scored 1,038 runs at an average of 24.71, with 7 half centuries and a single century high score of 15.  In the field he took 12 catches, while with the ball he took 5 wickets at an average of 33.80, with best figures of 3/31.

References

External links
Rajesh Rao at ESPNcricinfo
Rajesh Rao at CricketArchive

1974 births
Living people
People from Park Royal
Cricketers from Greater London
English cricketers
Sussex cricketers
Middlesex Cricket Board cricketers
British sportspeople of Indian descent
British Asian cricketers